Chad William Meyers (born August 8, 1975), is a former infielder and outfielder in Major League Baseball who played for the Chicago Cubs and the Seattle Mariners in parts of four seasons spanning 1999–2003.

Career
Commonly nicknamed 'Chaddie' and 'Chuckie', He later attended Creighton University in Omaha, NE, where he played for the Creighton Bluejays men's baseball team.

Later, Meyers played in the Mexican Baseball League, and winter ball for the Leones del Caracas and Caribes de Anzoátegui clubs of the Venezuelan Professional Baseball League.

References

External links

1975 births
Living people
American expatriate baseball players in Mexico
Baseball players from Nebraska
Caribes de Anzoátegui players
Chicago Cubs players
Creighton Bluejays baseball players
Creighton University alumni
Daytona Cubs players
Diablos Rojos del México players
Erie SeaWolves players
Guerreros de Oaxaca players
Iowa Cubs players
Leones del Caracas players
American expatriate baseball players in Venezuela
Major League Baseball center fielders
Major League Baseball left fielders
Major League Baseball second basemen
Major League Baseball third basemen
Memphis Redbirds players
Mexican League baseball center fielders
Mexican League baseball left fielders
Rockford Cubbies players
Rojos del Águila de Veracruz players
Sacramento River Cats players
Seattle Mariners players
Sportspeople from Omaha, Nebraska
Tacoma Rainiers players
West Tennessee Diamond Jaxx players
Williamsport Cubs players
Winnipeg Goldeyes players